New Denmark can refer to:

 New Denmark, New Brunswick, Canada
 New Denmark, Wisconsin, United States
 a literal translation of Latin Nova Dania, a failed Danish colonization attempt by Jens Munk  near the mouth of the Churchill River in Canada

See also 
 New Denmark (Nye Danmark), a Danish World War II pro-Nazi political party founded by Max Johannes Arildskov